Xie Yongjun (born 5 February 1980) is a Chinese fencer. He competed in the individual and team épée events at the 2004 Summer Olympics.

References

External links
 

1980 births
Living people
Chinese male épée fencers
Olympic fencers of China
Fencers at the 2004 Summer Olympics
Fencers from Liaoning
Sportspeople from Dandong
Asian Games medalists in fencing
Fencers at the 2002 Asian Games
Fencers at the 2006 Asian Games
Asian Games silver medalists for China
Medalists at the 2002 Asian Games
Medalists at the 2006 Asian Games
21st-century Chinese people